Ashland Airport may refer to

 Ashland County Airport in Ashland, Ohio, United States (FAA: 3G4)
 Ashland/Lineville Airport in Ashland/Lineville, Alabama, United States (FAA: 26A)
 Ashland Municipal Airport in Ashland, Oregon, United States (FAA: S03)
 Ashland Regional Airport in Ashland, Kentucky, United States (FAA: DWU)